Matthew John Smith (born 20 November 1973 in Tamworth, New South Wales) is a former field hockey player from Australia, who was a member of the Men's National Hockey Team that won the bronze medal at the 1996 Summer Olympics in Atlanta, Georgia. He played club hockey for the North Coast Raiders.

External links
 
 

1973 births
Living people
Australian male field hockey players
Olympic field hockey players of Australia
Field hockey players at the 1996 Summer Olympics
Olympic bronze medalists for Australia
1998 Men's Hockey World Cup players
People from Tamworth, New South Wales
Olympic medalists in field hockey
Medalists at the 1996 Summer Olympics
Commonwealth Games medallists in field hockey
Commonwealth Games gold medallists for Australia
Field hockey players at the 1998 Commonwealth Games
Field hockey players at the 2002 Commonwealth Games
Sportsmen from New South Wales
Field hockey people from New South Wales
Medallists at the 1998 Commonwealth Games
Medallists at the 2002 Commonwealth Games